Marriage is a Private Affair is a 1944 war-comedy film, directed by Robert Z. Leonard, based on novel Marriage Is a Private Affair (1941) by Judith Kelly. It stars Lana Turner, Frances Gifford and James Craig.

Plot

During World War II Theo has many boyfriends from the officer's club in New York City, who want to marry her.  Her mother, Mrs. Selworth, has been married many times.  Without much thought, Theo accepts a proposal of marriage from Tom West, an Air Corps lieutenant, about to ship out, not knowing if he'll come back.  After the honeymoon, Tom's father dies, a defense contractor making lenses for bomber sights, and the War Industries Board furloughs Tom from shipping out with the United States Army Air Corps (predecessor to the United States Air Force), and orders him to take over the lens production operation. Theo has a baby, hates the idea of being matronly, and considers a return to being one of the party girls at the O club. One of Tom's business partners, Joe Murdock, is an alcoholic, constantly disappearing, which requires Tom to work to fill in for him with defense contracts, making bomber lenses for the war effort. Theo turns to her dashing old flame, Major Lancing. To decide what she wants to do with her baby and her life, Theo must learn to grow up, and deal with the failings of those around her, and resist following their bad example.

Cast

 Lana Turner: Theo Scofield West
 James Craig: Miles Lancing
 John Hodiak: Lt. Tom Cochrane West
 Frances Gifford: Sissy Mortimer
 Hugh Marlowe: Joseph I. Murdock
 Natalie Schafer: Mrs. Irene Selworth 
 Keenan Wynn: Major Bob Wilton
 Herbert Rudley: Ted Mortimer
 Paul Cavanagh: Mr. Selworth
 Morris Ankrum: Mr. Ed Scofield
 Jane Green: Martha
 Tom Drake: Bill Rice
 Shirley Patterson: Mary Saunders
 Neal Dodd: Minister  
 Rhea Mitchell: Nurse
 Nana Bryant: Nurse
 Cecilia Callejo: Señora Guizman
 Virginia Brissac: Mrs. Courtland West
 Byron Foulger: Ned Bolton
 Addison Richards: Colonel Ryder
 Gino Corrado: Wedding Party Guest 
 Alexander D'Arcy: Mr. Garby

Reception
According to Hollywood Reporter news items, Marriage Is a Private Affair was the first Hollywood film to have a world premiere specifically for U.S. combat forces overseas. Lana Turner made a personal appearance at the premiere, which modern sources note took place on September 23, 1944 at a theater in Naples, Italy. In October 1944, According to MGM records the film earned $1,934,000 in the US and Canada and $715,000 elsewhere, making a $237,000 profit.

Radio adaptation
Marriage Is a Private Affair was presented on Screen Guild Theatre on June 17, 1946. Turner and Hodiak reprised their roles from the film.

References

External links
 
 Marriage is a Private Affair at TCMDB
 
 

Metro-Goldwyn-Mayer films
1944 films
Films with screenplays by Ring Lardner Jr.
Films directed by Robert Z. Leonard
Films scored by Bronisław Kaper
American war comedy films
1940s war comedy films
1944 comedy films
1940s English-language films
1940s American films